Nuda scriptura, also called solo scriptura, meaning "bare scripture" is a term used by some Protestants to describe the view that scripture is the only rule of faith to the exclusion of all other sources, while in contrast, sola scriptura teaches that the scripture alone is infallible, without excluding church tradition and other sources entirely, but viewing them as subordinate and ministerial.

History 
A view similar to nuda scriptura was advocated by Sebastian Franck, even arguing that the early Church theologians were servants of the Antichrist. Nuda scriptura was taught by a few Anabaptists such as Conrad Grebel and some radical reformers, insisting that Christians should not look to tradition but to the Scripture alone. However, many radical reformers did not argue for nuda scriptura, including Balthasar Hubmaier, who often quoted the Church fathers in his writings.

Some Evangelicals and many Plymouth Bretheren also teach views comparable to nuda scriptura. The view is especially common within modern fundamentalism.

In the 12th century, Petrobrusians Peter of Bruys and Henry of Lausanne disputed the authority of the Church Fathers and the Roman Catholic Church.

Restorationist minister Alexander Campbell (1788–1866) also taught a view akin to nuda scriptura.

See also 
 King James Only movement
 Prima scriptura
 The Shape of Sola Scriptura

References 

Christian theology of the Bible
Christian terminology